Mud Bay Logging Company was a 20th-century logging company based in Olympia, Washington. The company was established in 1899 as Western Washington Logging Company by Mark Draham, who had previously established Mason County Logging Company. The name changed to Mud Bay Logging Company in 1910. The company was disestablished in 1941.

Operations

Operations were in the Mud Bay, Thurston County, Washington area, harvesting timber from the Black Hills, hauling it out by logging railroad, and rafting the timber by water from a Mud Bay log dump to mills on Puget Sound. The railroad ran west from Mud Bay to Summit Lake, about halfway to McCleary, Washington. By 1918, in the Black Hills, the line run as far south as section 20 or 27 of township 17 north, range 3 west—almost as far as Littlerock.

The company was one of the last in the South Puget Sound area to use a logging railroad. Traces of the rail line can be easily seen across the greater Olympia area, now used as county roads and private driveways, a natural gas pipeline, and a nature trail.

The company became one of the seven founding members of the State Log Patrol, incorporated in 1928 and given special quasi-law enforcement powers over timber piracy by the state legislature.

Equipment
A  2-6-6-2 steam powered Mallet locomotive, serial number 60412, was built in 1928 by Baldwin Locomotive Works for Mud Bay Logging Company. It became a Weyerhaeuser Timber Company logging locomotive after Mud Bay dissolved, and was operated at Klamath Falls, Oregon. It was Weyerhaeuser's last steam locomotive. It was acquired by the Northwest Railway Museum at Snoqualmie, Washington, in 1965, and was last operated in 1974.

Legacy
The logging railroad has been converted to a rail trail, now the McLane Creek Nature Trail. The timberlands worked by Mud Bay have become part of  Capitol State Forest, a state-managed protected area including multi-use forest where logging continues but with modern forestry practices.

References

Sources

External links
Mud Bay Logging Company train via Washington Secretary of State historical logging photographs

Defunct companies based in Olympia, Washington
History of Olympia, Washington
1899 establishments in Washington (state)
1941 disestablishments in Washington (state)
Defunct forest products companies of the United States